Horemans:

 Gwendoline Horemans
 Jan Josef Horemans:
 Jan Josef Horemans the Elder 
 Jan Josef Horemans the Younger
 Peter Jacob Horemans (1700 – 1776) was a Flemish painter of genre scenes, portraits, conversation pieces, still lifes and city views.
 Siebe Horemans  (born 2 June 1998) is a Belgian professional footballer who plays for Gent in the Belgian First Division A.